Osamu Nakamata (born 10 October 1942) is a Japanese equestrian. He competed in the individual dressage event at the 1984 Summer Olympics.

References

1942 births
Living people
Japanese male equestrians
Olympic equestrians of Japan
Japanese dressage riders
Equestrians at the 1984 Summer Olympics
Place of birth missing (living people)
Asian Games medalists in equestrian
Equestrians at the 1986 Asian Games
Asian Games silver medalists for Japan
Medalists at the 1986 Asian Games